André Borschberg FRSGS (born December 13, 1952) is a Swiss entrepreneur, explorer, pilot, and speaker. He is the co-founder of the Solar Impulse project, the first ever round-the-world solar flight, successfully completed in July 2016. During the Japan-to-Hawaii leg, André broke the world record for longest solo flight in an airplane of any kind: 117 hours and 52 minutes, breaking Steve Fossett's 2006 record. Before that, on 7 July 2010, André completed the first 24-hour solar-powered flight. The flight set records for the longest manned solar-powered flight and the greatest height reached by a manned solar aircraft.

He currently holds 14 FAI world records in the free distance, free distance along a course, straight distance, straight distance predeclared waypoints, distance along a course, duration, absolute altitude, gain of height. His groundbreaking record: the longest solo flight in an airplane of any kind: 117 hours and 52 minutes.

Borschberg flew as a jet pilot in the Swiss Air Force prior to his work with Solar Impulse. An engineer by education and a graduate of the MIT Sloan School of Management, André Borschberg has solid experience in creating and managing companies. His passion for aviation and his interest in innovative solutions have led him to team up with Bertrand Piccard as CEO, co-founder, and pilot of Solar Impulse.

For his role in delivering and piloting Solar Impulse, André was awarded the Mungo Park Medal by the Royal Scottish Geographical Society in 2018. This was awarded jointly with Bertrand Piccard.

Pilot career
Fascinated by aviation from his earliest youth, André Borschberg trained as a pilot in the Swiss air force, flying first Venoms and then Hunters and Tigers for over 20 years. Today he holds both professional airplane and helicopter pilot's licenses and also does aerobatics in his spare time.

Engineer and management career

After graduating from the École Polytechnique Fédérale de Lausanne (EPFL) in mechanics and thermodynamics, he supplemented his training with a Master's in Management Science from the MIT Sloan School of Management, preceded by certificates in financial management and business management at HEC Lausanne. He first joined McKinsey, one of the world's leading business consultancies, as a consultant for five years, before starting his own entrepreneurial activities.

He went initially into partnership with a venture capital company, Lowe Finance. With a technical team from EPFL, he co-founded Innovative Silicon, a technology company in the field of microprocessor memories.

Solar Impulse

André Borschberg and Bertrand Piccard released in 2017 Objectif Soleil, a book about how they lived through Solar Impulse project.

Management
Borschberg is the head of the project Solar Impulse with Bertrand Piccard as the CEO, heading a team of 65 specialists and numerous partners.

Engineering
As a mechanical engineer and pilot, he is directing the construction of the aircraft and the preparation of the flight missions. "We need to find a way to build an aircraft that is super-robust & super-light at the same time, and above all extremely efficient with energy consumption, so as to need only minuscule amounts of energy in order to fly. But with the same degree of resistance as a normal airplane. Hence the great complexity of the project, which gives the true measure of its philosophy and its objectives."

Medical partner 
The emergency department of the Hirslanden Clinique Cecil is the official medical partner of Bertrand Piccard and André Borschberg’s world tour for Solar Impulse.

Solar Impulse 1 missions

 Solar Night Flight:

On 7 July 2010, André Borschberg has, for the first time in history, flown 26 hours with the Solar Impulse airplane, demonstrating at the same time the possibility to fly day and night with only solar energy to propel the airplane.

 European Solar Flights:

Solar Impulse HB-SIA, piloted by André Borschberg, completed three international flights during the European campaign: Payerne to Brussels on 13 May (630 km), Brussels to Paris-Le Bourget on 14 June (395 km), and Paris-Le Bourget to Payerne on 3 July (426 km).

 Crossing frontiers:

Solar Impulse, piloted alternately by André Borschberg and Bertrand Piccard, made its first intercontinental flight in 2012 from Switzerland (Payerne) to Toulouse, and then on to Morocco.

 Across America:

Solar Impulse has completed the historic crossing of the United States over a 2-month period in the summer of 2013. Bertrand Piccard and André Borschberg, the two pilots, flew from San Francisco to New York, stopping over in cities along the way.

With the goal of the world's first solar-powered round the world flight initiated on March 9, 2015, these flights have provided good learning opportunities in terms of slotting the solar aircraft into international air space and landing at international airports.

Solar Impulse 2 missions

Taking turns at the controls of the airplane with his partner Bertrand Piccard for the first ever round-the-world solar flight, successfully achieved in July 2016.

FAI world records
André Borschberg achieved 8 FAI world records flying with Solar Impulse 1. During three historical flights (2010 night flight, 2012 Payerne to Madrid, and 2013 Phoenix to Dallas), he was awarded 8 FAI World records: free distance, free distance along a course, straight distance, straight distance predeclared waypoints, distance along a course, duration, absolute altitude, gain of height.

With the Solar Impulse 2, he broke the record of the longest solo flight previously held by Steve Fosset. On 3 July 2015 Borschberg flew the solar-powered airplane between Nagoya (Japan) and Kalaeloa, Hawaii (US) for a duration of 4 days, 21 hours, and 52 minutes.

H55 
In early 2017 Borschberg co-founded the Swiss tech start-up H 55 based in Sion. H55 is a technological spinoff of Solar Impulse. The company develops and sells electric propulsion technologies to aircraft manufacturers.

In 2017 the company launched its first aircraft, the Aerol, followed by the Bristell Energic in 2019.

See also 
 International Committee of Clean Technologies

References

External links

 
 Official Solar Impulse website

1952 births
Swiss businesspeople
Swiss aviators
MIT Sloan School of Management alumni
Living people
École Polytechnique Fédérale de Lausanne alumni
Flight endurance record holders
Swiss aviation record holders
McKinsey & Company people
Fellows of the Royal Scottish Geographical Society